Kate McLoughlin is an Australian sports administrator. She has been Chef de Mission for three Australian Paralympic Teams and has been selected to carry out this role for 2024 Summer Paralympics.

McLoughlin graduated from Ravenswood School, Sydney in 1996. She completed a Bachelor of Arts at the  University of Technology Sydney, specialising in human movement and sports management. Prior to being employed by Paralympics Australia as a Senior Manager in 2009, she worked for several sports organisations including New South Wales Institute of Sport and Australian Olympic Committee. In 2009, she was the Villages Manager for the 2009 Australian Youth Olympic Festival. McLoughlin has been a Senior Manager at Paralympics Australia since 2009. McLoughlin  was selected to be the Chef de Mission of the Australian Team at the 2014 Winter Paralympics but withdrew due to family reasons.

 
McLoughlin has been involved in managing Australian Paralympic Teams:

 2012 – Deputy Chef de Mission (Operations) — Australian Team at the 2012 Summer Paralympics.
 2016 – Chef de Mission —  Australian Team at the 2016 Summer Paralympics. First female to hold this position.
 2020 – Chef de Mission Australian Team at the 2020 Summer Paralympics.
 2022 – Chef de Mission Australian Team at the 2022 Winter Paralympics. First female to hold this for a Winter Games.
 2024 – Chef de Mission  Australian Team at the 2024 Summer Paralympics.
Prior to the 2016 Rio Paralympics,  McLoughlin, team co-captain Daniela di Toro and Tim Matthews created 'The Mob'  to build team spirit.

Recognition
 2016 – Australian Institute of Sport Awards - AIS Leadership Award
 2017 – International Paralympic Committee Best Official Award at the 2016 Summer Paralympics.

References

Living people
Year of birth missing (living people)
Australian sports executives and administrators
Paralympics Australia officials
University of Technology Sydney alumni